Wydrza  is a village in the administrative district of Gmina Grębów, Tarnobrzeg County, Subcarpathian Voivodeship, Poland.

References

Wydrza